Coccopigya punctoradiata is a species of sea snail, deep-sea limpet, a marine gastropod mollusk in the family Cocculinidae. Type locality of this species is at Tosa Bay, Japan.

Description

Distribution
This species is seen in Japan, South Korea and Taiwan.
They habitat in deep sea.

References

External links

Cocculinidae
Gastropods described in 1949